"Never Say Goodbye" is the second single from Yoko Ono's 1982 album It's Alright (I See Rainbows). Like many of Ono's songs from this period, the lyrics deal with her emotional healing following the murder of her husband John Lennon. The upbeat new wave song samples a recording of Lennon screaming Yoko's name from their Wedding Album, followed by her son Sean waking her, as if it were a bad dream. The song garnered minor airplay upon release. "Loneliness" appeared on the B-side. The 1995 New York Rock version was also released as a single.

Cash Box said that "Ono uses synthesizers, angelic back-up vocals and natural effects like buzzing bees, chirping birds and a muffled male voice to create a dark, mystical and often haunting song."

"Never Say Goodbye" also appeared as a B-Side on the U.K. 12" release of John Lennon's single "Borrowed Time".

Tracklists 
U.S. 7" Single (25 January 1983)
"Never Say Goodbye" (7" Version) - 3:23
"Loneliness" (7" Version) - 3:21

U.S. 12" Single (22 February 1983)
"Never Say Goodbye" (Remix) - 4:27
"Loneliness" (Remix) - 4:23

U.S. 7" Jukebox Single (1995)
"Never Say Goodbye"
"We're All Water"

Official versions 
Never Say Goodbye
Album Version - 4:25
7" Version - 3:23
12" Version - 4:27
Onobox Edit - 4:01
1997 Remix - 4:17 (from It's Alright Remastered Edition)

Loneliness
1974 Album Version - 3:33 (from shelved A Story Album - unreleased until 1992)
1982 Album Version - 3:47
7" Version - 3:21
12" Version - 4:23
1997 Remix - 3:34 (from It's Alright Remastered Edition)

References

Songs about parting
Yoko Ono songs
1982 singles
Song recordings produced by Yoko Ono
Songs written by Yoko Ono
1982 songs
Polydor Records singles